Qarayazı is a village in the Agstafa Rayon of Azerbaijan.  The village forms part of the municipality of Köçvəlili.

References 

Populated places in Aghstafa District